Virginia is a 1941 American drama film directed by Edward H. Griffith and starring Madeleine Carroll, Fred MacMurray, Sterling Hayden (onscreen debut), Helen Broderick and Marie Wilson.

Plot
The film opens at the train station of the fictional Fairville, Virginia, as an African-American man named "Carburetor" is playing the guitar and singing. Jackson "Stoney" Elliott and his daughter, "Pretty", watch the arrival of a train that has brought Charlotte "Charlie" Dunterry to town.

Charlie was born in Dunterry but has lived in New York where she worked in show business. She has returned to Fairville to sell the Dunterry estate where she was born and which she has inherited. Stoney and Charlie realize that they were childhood friends as he drives her out to the property.

Stoney is married but estranged from his wife who lives in Europe. He lives with his daughter and his cousin, "Miss Theo", in a modest home near the Dunterry property.

Charlie discovers that the 150-year-old family home, a large Colonial house designed by Thomas Jefferson, is in poor condition. Aunt Ophelia, an African-American servant who was present when Charlie was born, welcomes her back to the family home and takes her on a tour of the estate.

Norman Williams is a wealthy carpet bagger who has purchased the adjacent Elliott estate that was formerly owned by Stoney's family. Williams begins to court Charlie.

Electing to remain in Virginia and restore the Dunterry estate to its former stature, Charlie develops feelings for Stoney, but his marital situation causes him to resist. A frustrated Charlie accepts a marriage proposal from Norman, who then hides from her the knowledge that Stoney's wife is dead. Only on their wedding day does Norman's conscience persuade him to tell Charlie the truth, allowing her to follow her heart.

Cast
 Madeleine Carroll as Charlotte "Charlie" Dunterry
 Fred MacMurray as Stonewall "Stoney" Elliott
 Sterling Hayden as Norman Williams
 Helen Broderick as Theo Clairmont
 Carolyn Lee as Pretty Elliott 
 Marie Wilson as Connie Potter
 Paul Hurst as Thomas
 Tom Rutherford as Carter Francis
 Leigh Whipper as Ezechial
 Louise Beavers as Ophelia
 Darby Jones as Joseph

Production
Virginia was a Paramount Pictures production. Edward H. Griffith directed and produced the film and is also co-credited with the story. Virginia Van Upp wrote the screenplay and is also co-credited with the story. Bert Glennon and William V. Skall were the directors of photography. Hans Dreier and Ernst Fegté provided the production design, and Eda Warren was the film's editor.

Thomas Jefferson reportedly played a part in designing the four historic homes used in the picture. This led the director to suggest that, if the art directors guild would permit, Jefferson's name should be added to the art direction credits along with Dreier and Fegté.

Reception
At the time of its release, the film was described by the Richmond Times-Disptach as "a good picture, with a full load of laughter, action, romance and the touch of pathos that all good pictures should have."

See also
 Sterling Hayden filmography

References

External links
 

1941 films
1941 drama films
1940s English-language films
American drama films
Films directed by Edward H. Griffith
Films set in Virginia
1940s American films